Greatest Hits is a compilation album by the Canadian-American rock group the Band. It was released in 2000 on Capitol Records. The album was released in conjunction with remastered versions of the group's first four albums. It draws very heavily from these records, with thirteen of the eighteen tracks selected from Music from Big Pink, The Band, Stage Fright and Cahoots.

Track listing
All tracks composed by Robbie Robertson unless otherwise noted.

Group members and other participants
The Band – producers (9–18)
Rick Danko – bass, fiddle, vocals
Levon Helm – drums, mandolin, rhythm guitar, bass, tambourine, vocals
Garth Hudson – organ, piano, clavinet, synthesizers, accordion, wind instruments, bagpipe chanter, bass pedals
Richard Manuel – piano, clavinet, organ, drums, harmonica, vocals
Robbie Robertson – guitars
John Simon – producer (1–8), tenor saxophone (2), baritone saxophone (3), tuba (7), electric piano (8)
Allen Toussaint – horn arrangement (12)
Billy Mundi – drums (14)
Byron Berline – fiddle (17)
See individual albums for engineering credits.

References

2000 greatest hits albums
Albums produced by John Simon (record producer)
Capitol Records compilation albums
The Band compilation albums